Kartalpınar can refer to:

 Kartalpınar, Ardahan
 Kartalpınar, Burdur